The Juno Award for "Music DVD of the Year" has been awarded since 2004, as recognition each year for the best music DVD in Canada. It was discontinued in 2014.

Winners

Music DVD of the Year (2004–2013)

2004 — Rush/Andrew MacNaughtan/Daniel Catullo (directors) /Allan Weinrib/Pegi Cecconi/Ray Danniels (producers), Rush in Rio by Rush
2005 — Blue Rodeo/Ron Mann, In Stereovision by Blue Rodeo
2006 — The Tragically Hip/Pierre Lamoureux/François Lamoureux/Christopher Mills/Gord Downie/Allan Reid/Shawn Marino, Hipeponymous by The Tragically Hip
2007 — Sarah Harmer/Andy Keen/Patrick Sambrook/Bryan Bean, Escarpment Blues by Sarah Harmer
2008 — Billy Talent/Pierre Lamoureux/François Lamoureux/Pierre Tremblay/Steve Blair, 666 Live by Billy Talent
2009 — Blue Rodeo/Christopher Mills/Geoff McLean, Blue Road by Blue Rodeo
2010 — Iron Maiden/Stefan Demetriou/Sam Dunn/Scott McFadyen/Rod Smallwood/Andy Taylor, Iron Maiden: Flight 666 by Iron Maiden
2011 — Rush/Scot McFadyen/Sam Dunn/Pegi Cecconi/Shelley Nott/Noah Segal/John Virant, Rush: Beyond the Lighted Stage by Rush
2012 — Anthony Seck/Janine McInnes/Chip Sutherland, Feist: Look at What the Light Did Now by Feist
2013 — The Tragically Hip/Andy Keen/Bernie Breen/Patrick Sambrook/Shawn Marino, Bobcaygeon by The Tragically Hip

Music DVD